The 2019 U.S. Open Polo Championship was the 103rd installment of the U.S. Open Polo Championship and was held at the International Polo Club Palm Beach in Wellington, Florida from March 27 to April 21, 2019.

A total of 16 teams entered the tournament and a total of 31 matches were played.

The winning team, Pilot, consisted of Curtis Pilot, Matias Gonzalez, Facundo Pieres, and Gonzalo Pieres Jr.

Qualifying - Group stage

Groups were created via a draw held on the evening of March 20, 2019, at the IPC Pavilion in Wellington, Florida

Final stage

Quarterfinal brackets were determined by group winners who drew from the pool of second place teams from outside their own group.

Team Rosters

Team Statistics

Individual Scorers 

Notes:

Game Scores

References 

Polo competitions in the United States
2019 in American sports